Auchlochan is a village in South Lanarkshire, Scotland. It is on the River Nethan and is located near the villages of Birkwood, Braehead and Coalburn. The nearest town being Lesmahagow which is 
connected via New Trows Road.

History
From 1890 to 1968 they were several collieries in the area known as the Auchlochan Collieries. From 1907 to 1965 there was a railway station called Auchlochan Platform railway station.

Overview
There is a MHA retirement village.
As well as a golf club.

Notable residents
 Ivy Wallace (1915–2006), author and illustrator
 George Patterson (1920–2012), engineer and missionary

See also
List of places in South Lanarkshire

References

Villages in South Lanarkshire